Miroslav Abelovský (born June 6, 1948) is a Slovak politician.

Born in Zvolen, Miroslav Abelovský was elected to the National Council of the Slovak Republic in the parliamentary elections in 2002 for the People's Party – Movement for a Democratic Slovakia. He was re-elected in the 2006 Slovak parliamentary election.

References

Members of the National Council (Slovakia) 2002-2006
Members of the National Council (Slovakia) 2006-2010
1948 births
Living people
People from Zvolen